The United States sent a delegation to compete at the 1984 Winter Paralympics in Innsbruck, Austria.

The United States finished 5th in the gold medal and 4th in the total medal count.

Medalists

The following American athletes won medals at the games. In the 'by discipline' sections below, medalists' names are in bold.

|  style="text-align:left; width:78%; vertical-align:top;"|

|  style="text-align:left; width:22%; vertical-align:top;"|

Classification
Each event had separate standing, sitting, or visually impaired classifications:

LW2 - standing: single leg amputation above the knee
LW 3 - standing: double leg amputation below the knee, mild cerebral palsy, or equivalent impairment
LW4 - standing: single leg amputation below the knee
LW5/7 - standing: double arm amputation
LW6/8 - standing: single arm amputation
LW9 - standing: amputation or equivalent impairment of one arm and one leg
Gr I - sitting: paraplegia with no or some upper abdominal function and no functional sitting balance
Gr II - sitting: paraplegia with fair functional sitting balance
B1 - visually impaired: no functional vision
B2 - visually impaired: up to ca 3-5% functional vision

Alpine skiing

Cross-country skiing 

 Women

See also
United States at the 1984 Winter Olympics

References

 

 

 

Athlete Search Results - USA - 1984PWG, International Paralympic Committee (IPC)

Nations at the 1984 Winter Paralympics
1984
1984 in American sports